Marc-André Hamelin, OC, OQ (born September 5, 1961), is a Canadian virtuoso pianist and composer. Hamelin has received 11 Grammy Award nominations.  He is on the faculty of the New England Conservatory of Music.

Biography

Born in Montreal, Quebec, Hamelin began his piano studies at the age of five. His father, a pharmacist by trade who was also an amateur pianist, introduced him to the works of Charles-Valentin Alkan, Leopold Godowsky, and Kaikhosru Shapurji Sorabji when he was still young. He studied at the École de musique Vincent-d'Indy in Montreal with Yvonne Hubert and then at Temple University in Philadelphia with Harvey Wedeen. In 1989, he was awarded the Virginia Parker Prize.

Hamelin has given recitals in many cities. Festival appearances have included Bad Kissingen, Belfast, Cervantino, La Grange de Meslay, Husum Piano Rarities, Lanaudière, Ravinia, La Roque d’Anthéron, Ruhr Piano, Halifax (Nova Scotia), Singapore Piano, Snape Maltings Proms, Mänttä Music Festival, Turku and Ottawa Strings of the Future, as well as the Chopin Festivals of Bagatelle (Paris), Duszniki and Valldemossa. He appears regularly in both the Wigmore Hall Masterconcert Series and the International Piano Series at London’s South Bank Centre. He plays annually in the Herkulessaal in Munich and has given a series of recitals in Tokyo.

Hamelin has made recordings of a wide variety of composers with the Hyperion label. His recording of Leopold Godowsky's complete Studies on Chopin's Études won the 2000 Gramophone Magazine Instrumental Award. He is well known for his attention to lesser-known composers, especially of the late nineteenth and early twentieth century (Max Reger's Piano Concerto, Leo Ornstein, Nikolai Roslavets, Georgy Catoire), and for performing works by the pianist-composers Sophie-Carmen Eckhardt-Gramatté, Leopold Godowsky, Charles-Valentin Alkan, Kaikhosru Sorabji, Alexander Scriabin, Nikolai Kapustin, Franz Liszt, Nikolai Medtner, and Frederic Rzewski.

Hamelin has also composed several works, including a set of piano études in all of the minor keys, which was completed in September 2009 and is published by C. F. Peters, with a recording released on the Hyperion label. A cycle of seven pieces, called Con Intimissimo Sentimento, was published (with a recording by Hamelin) by Ongaku No Tomo Sha, and a transcription of Zequinha de Abreu's Tico-Tico No Fubá has been published by Schott Music. Although the majority of his compositions are for piano solo, he has also written three pieces for player piano (including the comical Circus Galop, Pop Music for Player Piano based upon "Pop Goes the Weasel", and Solfeggietto a cinque, which is based on a theme by C.P.E. Bach), and several works for other forces, including Fanfares for three trumpets, published by Presser. His other works are distributed by the Sorabji Archive.

In 1985, Hamelin won the Carnegie Hall International Competition for American Music. In 2004, he received the international record award in Cannes. Hamelin has been made an Officer of the Order of Canada and a Chevalier de l'Ordre national du Québec (National Order of Québec). He has won seven Juno Awards, the most recent one in 2012 for Classical Album of the Year: Solo or Chamber Ensemble for his Liszt Piano Sonata album.

Critical appraisal
Writing in The New Yorker in 2000, senior critic Alex Ross pronounced: "Hamelin’s legend will grow—right now there is no one like him." Later in 2010, Ross added that Hamelin is ranked highly by piano connoisseurs, and "is admired for his monstrously brilliant technique and his questing, deep-thinking approach."

In 2015, Zachary Woolfe, classical music editor of The New York Times, noted Mr. Hamelin's "preternatural clarity and control, qualities that in him don’t preclude sensitivity [or] even poetry".

Discography

Personal life
Hamelin's first marriage was to soprano Jody Karin Applebaum. He currently lives in Boston, Massachusetts, with his second wife Cathy Fuller, pianist and WGBH classical music broadcaster. Hamelin has Type 1 diabetes.

References

External links 
  Hamelin, Marc-André entry in Encyclopedia of Music in Canada part of The Canadian Encyclopedia. Archived at the Wayback Machine.
 Extensive interview by Ethan Iverson
 Official Website
 Marc-André Hamelin at Hyperion Records
 Complete Discography
 Discography of Marc-André Hamelin, organized alphabetically by composer in three categories (Solo recordings, Concerto recordings, Other), with month and year of recording (by Frazer Jarvis)
 Marc-André Hamelin at Colbert Artists Management, Inc.

1961 births
Canadian classical pianists
Male classical pianists
Contemporary classical music performers
French Quebecers
Juno Award for Classical Album of the Year – Solo or Chamber Ensemble winners
Knights of the National Order of Quebec
Living people
Officers of the Order of Canada
Musicians from Montreal
20th-century classical composers
21st-century classical composers
Male classical composers
20th-century Canadian pianists
Canadian male pianists
21st-century classical pianists
20th-century Canadian male musicians
21st-century Canadian male musicians